Cornelius David Murphy (November 1, 1870 – December 14, 1945) was a Major League Baseball catcher. Murphy's minor league baseball career spanned seventeen seasons, from  until .

External links

Major League Baseball catchers
Cincinnati Reds players
Davenport Hawkeyes players
Quincy Black Birds players
London Tecumsehs (baseball) players
Quincy Ravens players
Albany Senators players
Binghamton Bingos players
Troy Trojans (minor league) players
Atlanta Windjammers players
Indianapolis Hoosiers (minor league) players
New Bedford Whalers (baseball) players
New Bedford Browns players
Springfield Ponies players
Little Rock Travelers players
Brockton Whalers players
Lawrence Colts players
Haverhill Hustlers players
Baseball players from Massachusetts
1870 births
1945 deaths
19th-century baseball players
Fitchburg (minor league baseball) players